San Antonio de las Vegas is a consejo popular (translates to “popular council” in English) in San José de las Lajas, Mayabeque Province, Cuba, a village, and a former municipality.

References 

San José de las Lajas

Populated places in Mayabeque Province